The rapture is a predicted event in certain systems of Christian eschatology.

Rapture or The Rapture may also refer to:

 Rapture (Buddhism), a common translation of the Pali word piti, which is a factor of meditative absorption
 A feeling of ecstatic joy or delight, synonymous with ecstasy

Music

Bands
 The Rapture (band), a rock band based in the city of New York
 Rapture (band), a Finland-based doom metal band
 Rapture (hardcore band), a Christian punk band from San Francisco, California

Albums
 Rapture (Anita Baker album), 1986
 Rapture (Betraying the Martyrs album), 2019
 Rapture (Bradley Joseph album), 1997
 Rapture (Dragonlord album), 2001
 Rapture (Impaled Nazarene album), 1998
 Rapture (EP), by Koffee, 2019
 Rapture (The Mavis's album), 2001
 Rapture (Johnny Mathis album), 1962
 Rapture (Trio X album), 1999
 Rapture (Peter Mulvey album), 1995
 Rapture, a 2012 album by Romeo's Daughter
 The Rapture (album), by Siouxsie and the Banshees, released in 1995

Songs and instrumental works
 "Rapture" (Blondie song), 1981
 "Rapture" (iiO song), 2001
 "Rapture" (Hurt song), 2006
 "Rapture" (Morbid Angel song), 1993
 Rapture (composition), a 2000 orchestral composition by Christopher Rouse
Rapture, a 2001 composition by Michael Torke
 "Rapture", a song by Deftones from the 2006 album Saturday Night Wrist
 "Rapture", a song by Laura Veirs from the 2004 album Carbon Glacier
 "Rapture", the opening theme of anime series  Zodiac War by Panama Panorama Town
 "The Rapture", a song by Senses Fail from the 2006 album Still Searching
 "The Rapture", a song by Puscifer from the 2011 album Conditions of My Parole

Film and television 
 Rapture (1950 film), an Italian romantic drama film
 The Rapture (1954 film), a Mexican drama film
 Rapture (1965 film), a film starring Dean Stockwell
 The Rapture (1991 film), a film starring Mimi Rogers
 Rapture (TV series), a 2018 American docu-series
 "Rapture" (Battlestar Galactica), an episode of the re-imagined Battlestar Galactica
 "Rapture" (Star Trek: Deep Space Nine), the fifth-season episode of Star Trek: Deep Space Nine
 "The Rapture" (Supernatural), an episode of the television series Supernatural
 Rapture TV, a UK television station

Literature 
 Rapture (Sosnowski novel), a 1996 novel by David S. Sosnowski
 Rapture, a 2002 novel by Susan Minot
 The Rapture, a 2009 novel by Liz Jensen
 The Rapture (novel), the fifteenth book in the Left Behind series written by Tim LaHaye and Jerry B. Jenkins
 The Rapture (audio drama), audio drama based on the British science fiction television series Doctor Who
 Rapture (Kate novel), the fourth novel in the Fallen series by American author Lauren Kate

Video games 
 Rapture (video game), a codename for Square Enix's MMORPG video game Final Fantasy XIV
 Rapture (BioShock), a fictitious underwater city

Other uses 
 Rapture, Indiana, an unincorporated community in Posey County, Indiana, United States
 Rapture (engine), the proprietary engine of Iron Realms Entertainment which handles networking issues and supports C-like script

See also

 
 
 
 Rapt (disambiguation)
 Raptor (disambiguation)
 Raptus (disambiguation)
 Rupture (disambiguation)